Trichonemasomatidae is a family of millipedes belonging to the order Julida.

Genera:
 Trichonemasoma Mauriès & Vicente, 1977

References

Julida